Firoz Dastur (also spelled Feroze Dastur) (30 September 1919 – 9 May 2008) was an Indian actor and an Indian classical vocalist from the Kirana gharana (singing style).

Career
Dastur worked in the Indian film industry in 1930s, acting in a few films by Wadia Movietone and others. In 1933, when Wadia Movietone under JBH Wadia, released its first talkie film, he performed classical songs as child actor in film Lal-e-Yaman. But his first love was Indian classical music.

He was a disciple of Sawai Gandharva, whose other disciples were Bhimsen Joshi and Gangubai Hangal, and a regular performer at Sawai Gandharva Music Festival for several years, well into his late 80s.

Dastur's music was very close to Abdul Karim Khan's style. He taught music to many students.

Death
Firoz Dastur died in May 2008 in Mumbai, India after a brief illness. He was 89.

Bibliography

References

External links 
 

1919 births
2008 deaths
Hindustani singers
20th-century Indian male classical singers
Male actors from Mumbai
Indian male film actors
Male actors in Hindi cinema
Indian music educators
Kirana gharana
20th-century Indian male actors
Singers from Mumbai
20th-century Khyal singers
Recipients of the Sangeet Natak Akademi Award